Wormhout (before 1975: Wormhoudt) is a commune in the Nord department in northern France. Several people in Wormhout still speak West Flemish, a local dialect of Dutch and the traditional language of the region, while French-speakers form a majority, due to centuries of French political and cultural influence.

The town's name is of Germanic origin, meaning "Wormwood."

Neighbouring towns and villages :
Ledringhem to the south-west, separated by river Peene Becque
Esquelbecq

Population

Heraldry

Sights

 Old wind mill
 Jeanne Devos museum
 Wormhoudt Communal Cemetery

Education
Wormhout has a number of school providing education structures for all of the pupils around the town : école du bocage, école Roger Salengro, école Saint-Joseph, collège du Houtland, école Jean Moulin, collège Notre-Dame, lycée de l'Yser.

Twinnage
Wormhout is twinned with the resort town of Llandudno, Conwy, Wales.

See also
Wormhoudt massacre
Communes of the Nord department

References

Communes of Nord (French department)
French Flanders